The Arthur C. Clarke Award is a British award given for the best science fiction novel first published in the United Kingdom during the previous year. It is named after British author Arthur C. Clarke, who gave a grant to establish the award in 1987. The award has been described as "the UK's most prestigious science fiction prize".

Any "full-length" science fiction novel written or translated into English is eligible for the prize, provided that it was first published in the United Kingdom during the prior calendar year. There is no restriction on the nationality of the author, and the publication history of works outside the United Kingdom is not taken into consideration. Books may be submitted for consideration by their publishing company, and, beginning in 2016, self-published titles have been eligible with certain qualifications. An official call for entries is issued to UK publishers every year and members of the judging panel and organisation committee also actively call in titles they would like to see submitted. A title must be actively submitted in order to be considered. The judges form a shortlist of six works that they feel are worthy of consideration, from which they select a winning book. The winner receives an engraved bookend and a prize consisting of a number of pounds sterling equal to the current year, such as £2012 for the year 2012. Prior to 2001, the award was £1000.

During the 35 nomination years, 141 authors have had works nominated, 32 of whom have won. China Miéville has won three times, while Pat Cadigan and Geoff Ryman have won twice each; no other author has won multiple times. Stephen Baxter and Gwyneth Jones have the most nominations, at seven each, and Baxter has the most nominations without winning. Neal Stephenson has won once out of six nominations; Ken MacLeod and Kim Stanley Robinson have also been nominated six times. Paul J. McAuley and Miéville have been nominated five times; McAuley has one win, whereas MacLeod and Robinson have none.

Winners and nominees

In the following table, the years correspond to the date of the ceremony, rather than when the novel was first published. Each year links to the corresponding "year in literature". Entries with a blue background and an asterisk (*) next to the writer's name have won the award; those with a white background are the other nominees on the shortlist.

  *   Winners

References

External links
 

1987 establishments in the United Kingdom
Arthur C. Clarke
Awards established in 1987
British fiction awards
British speculative fiction awards
English literary awards
Lists of speculative fiction-related award winners and nominees
Science fiction awards